Omega Epsilon Sigma was a collegiate sorority operating in the United States from 1925 until, approximately, 1930. It is the second known organization for college women with Order of the Eastern Star affiliation, the first being Achoth.

Omicron Epsilon Sigma 

Omega Epsilon Sigma was founded as Omicron Epsilon Sigma on January 3, 1925, at Central Missouri State Teachers College (now University of Central Missouri). The 1925 edition of the Sunflower yearbook described the sorority's membership policy as "eligibility to membership in this organization is based upon affiliation with the Order of the Eastern Star."

On April 21, 1925, the sorority was recognized by the Grand Matron of the Grand Chapter of Kansas.

The yearbook also described the Masonic association. "Through the kindness of the Shriners of Emporia semi-monthly meetings are held in the Shrine room of the Masonic Temple. Although yet in its infancy Omicron has a large membership and is exerting a democratic influence on the campus."

According to the yearbook, Omicron's purpose "is to promote friendship among the girls of the school who are members of this fraternal order."

The colors were yellow and white; the flower was the snapdragon.

Name change 
It appears there was a consolidation of several other Eastern Star affiliated locals shortly after formation of Omicron Epsilon Sigma. An undated copy of the constitution and bylaws noted the change to Omega Epsilon Sigma.

The colors were changed to green and white, and the flower changed to the growing narcissus.

The badge is described as a "regular pentagon bordered with perals, five on a side surrounding a field of black, in the center of which is a gold five pointed star which points downward with an emerald in its center; above the star, the letter [Omega] in gold and at the bottom on either side of the fifth point, the letters, [Epsilon] and [Sigma] in gold."

The purpose was "to inspire each member to grow in strength and beauty of character by emphasizing the living as well as the teaching of moral principles; to strength existing fraternal relations through college fellowship, also to promote high ideals of scholarship, and social relations."

While some of its chapters appear to have continued after 1927, that year, the first two chapters formed withdrew, soon becoming chapters of Theta Sigma Upsilon, which later merged with Alpha Gamma Delta.

Chapters 
Chapter information from the Baird's Manual Online Archive.

The previously mentioned constitution and bylaws referenced a chapter at Central Missouri State College. All other chapter information is from the Baird's listings for Omega Epsilon Sigma and for Theta Sigma Upsilon.

References 

 Kansas State Teachers College (Emporia State University), The Sunflower yearbook, 1925, p. 178
 Constitution and By-laws of Omega Epsilon Sigma (undated)

See also 
 Achoth (became Phi Omega Pi)
 Order of the Eastern Star

Student organizations established in 1925
Fraternities and sororities in the United States
Masonic youth organizations
Women's masonic organizations
1925 establishments in Kansas